Blake Masters is an American writer, director, and producer of films and television series. Masters is best known as the creator of the Showtime television series Brotherhood, developer of the NBC television series Law & Order: LA, and co-executive producer and writer of the NBC television series Crossbones. Masters also wrote the screenplay for the film 2 Guns.

Early life 
Masters grew up in New England. Masters graduated from Stanford University with a degree in economics.

Career 
Before creating Brotherhood, Masters made a living selling screenplays to studios. However, he never was able to get an original project produced. Brotherhood was conceived as a feature film; after some input, Masters decided to adapt it into a television series. He wrote the 2013 film 2 Guns, directed by Baltasar Kormákur and starring Denzel Washington and Mark Wahlberg.

Masters and Henry Bromell created the USA Network series Falling Water. In 2023, it was announced that writer and executive producer Masters was at the helm of a new series entitled Miraculous, starring Anthony Anderson as a car salesman who can perform miracles.

Personal life 
Masters resided with his wife and two daughters in a 1920s Spanish-style house in the Hollywood Hills neighborhood of Los Angeles until 2017, when the home was put on the market for $2.195 million. The family now resides in the city's Los Feliz neighborhood, in a 1940s residence Masters purchased for nearly $2.5 million in 2017.

In a humorous video in October 2022, Masters endorsed Democratic incumbent Mark Kelly against the Republican nominee who shares his name and alma mater in the 2022 United States Senate election in Arizona.

Filmography

Television 
 Sneaky Pete (2019; showrunner / executive producer)
 Falling Water (2016; creator / writer / director / executive producer)
 Survivor's Remorse (2015; writer / consulting producer)
 Line of Sight (2014 TV movie; writer / executive producer)
 Crossbones (2014; writer / co-executive producer)
 Law & Order: LA (2010-2011; developed by / executive producer)
 Rubicon (TV series) (2010; writer / consulting producer)
 Brotherhood (2006-2008; creator / writer / director)

Film 
 2 Guns (2013; screenplay by)
 Convenience (1997 short; writer / director / executive producer)
 The Audition (1995 short; writer / director / executive producer)

References

External links 

Interview at About.com
Showtime Brotherhood site, special features section, featuring interviews with Masters

American male screenwriters
American television producers
Living people
Year of birth missing (living people)